James M. Gibbons (3 August 1924 – 20 December 1997) was an Irish Fianna Fáil politician who served as Minister for Agriculture from 1970 to 1973 and 1977 to 1979, Minister for Defence from 1969 to 1970 and Parliamentary Secretary to the Minister for Finance from 1965 to 1969. He served as a Teachta Dála (TD) for the Carlow–Kilkenny constituency from 1957 to 1981 and February 1982 to November 1982. He also served as a Member of the European Parliament (MEP) from 1973 to 1977.

Early life
Gibbons was a native of Bonnettsrath, County Kilkenny. Gibbons was born into a very political family. His uncle Seán Gibbons was elected to Dáil Éireann as a Cumann na nGaedheal candidate at the 1923 general election, but later joined the Farmer's Party and eventually joined Fianna Fáil.

Gibbons was educated locally and later attended Kilkenny CBS and St Kieran's College. Here, he earned a reputation on the sports field, winning a Leinster colleges' hurling title. Following the completion of his Leaving Certificate he studied medicine at University College Dublin, however, he abandoned his studies after two years to return to Kilkenny where he concentrated on farming.

Gibbons later bought a 300-acre farm at the Pheasantgry, Dunmore, about four miles from Kilkenny.

Political career
Gibbons was politically active from an early age, having joined Fianna Fáil in his youth. He was co-opted onto Kilkenny County Council in 1954, and secured election to that authority in his own right the following year. He remained as a county councillor until 1967.

Gibbons was elected to Dáil Éireann for the Carlow–Kilkenny constituency at the 1957 general election. He secured re-election at the 1961 general election, however, he remained on the government backbenches for a second term.

Following the 1965 general election, Gibbons secured promotion to the junior ministerial ranks under Seán Lemass, when he was appointed Parliamentary Secretary to the Minister for Finance. In this position he served under Jack Lynch and later under Charles Haughey.

Minister for Defence (1969–1970)
Following Fianna Fáil's fourth general election triumph in succession at the 1969 general election, Gibbons joined Jack Lynch's cabinet as Minister for Defence. His short tenure in the role would come to define his political career. In August 1969, civil unrest in Northern Ireland boiled over and the Irish government were forced to act. Lynch urged his cabinet to take a cautious line and established a cabinet subcommittee to organise emergency assistance and relief. A government fund of £100,000 was set up to provide relief to nationalist civilians forced out of their homes by the Troubles, and Charles Haughey, as Minister for Finance, was given sole authority over this money. The Minister for Agriculture, Neil Blaney, allegedly made plans with Captain James Kelly to import weapons from continental Europe. Haughey provided the money for the purchase from his civilian relief fund, and also tried to arrange customs clearance for the shipment.

In May 1970, the Arms Crisis broke when Haughey and Blaney were sacked by Lynch when the plot to import arms was revealed. At the subsequent Arms Trial Gibbons would be the chief prosecutorial witness and his evidence would contradict Haughey's. Haughey was found not guilty, therefore Gibbons was implied to have been dishonest, an allegation that affected him deeply. He was never charged with any offence himself and was angry that a Dáil motion of confidence in the government effectively turned into a debate about him personally.

Minister for Agriculture and Fisheries (1970–1973)
In the wake of the Arms Crisis and the ministerial sackings, Gibbons was appointed as Minister for Agriculture and Fisheries. As a farmer himself, he was respected and liked by the farming community and its representatives. In his new role Gibbons played a key role in the agricultural negotiations concerning entry into the European Economic Community and in the amalgamation of creameries in the country.

In opposition (1973–1977)
Fianna Fáil lost office to a Fine Gael–Labour Party coalition following the 1973 general election. He remained a key member of Jack Lynch's team. Shortly after the general election he was appointed a member of the second delegation from the Oireachtas to the European Parliament. In 1975 Gibbons was appointed to Jack Lynch's new front bench as Spokesperson on Agriculture. Charles Haughey, with whom he had clashed with in the Arms Crisis, also re-joined the front bench.

Minister for Agriculture (1977–1979)
Following Fianna Fáil's huge triumph at the 1977 general election, Gibbons's tenure as an MEP ended and he returned to Jack Lynch's new cabinet as Minister for Agriculture. Once again his appointment was welcomed by farmers.

In 1979, Gibbons clashed with the Minister for Health and Social Welfare, Charles Haughey, over the Family Planning Bill. As a devout Catholic, Gibbons voted against the bill that legalised the sale of contraceptives. He was the first government minister in the history of the state to vote against his own government, yet the Taoiseach, Jack Lynch, took no action against him. This action only exacerbated the ill-feeling between Gibbons and Haughey.

In December 1979, Jack Lynch announced his resignation as Taoiseach and Fianna Fáil leader. The subsequent leadership election turned into a straight battle between Haughey and George Colley. The latter had the backing of almost every member of the existing cabinet; however, a backbench revolt saw Haughey narrowly become Taoiseach and party leader.

In the resulting cabinet reshuffle Gibbons and Bobby Molloy lost their ministerial positions, as Haughey promoted backbenchers who had supported him.

Later political career
Following his departure from cabinet, Gibbons became a vocal critic of Haughey's leadership of Fianna Fáil. After he lost his seat at the 1981 general election he openly called for a change of leadership within the party.

Gibbons regained his seat at the February 1982 general election and voted against Haughey in the leadership challenge that was proposed by Charlie McCreevy. Leaving Leinster House after the vote he was attacked by a number of drunken Fianna Fáil supporters and forced to the ground. A friend of his saw off the attackers. In the aftermath, new swivel doors were erected to prevent mobs pushing their way into the parliament building. The incident was recounted by Desmond O'Malley in the RTÉ documentary series Seven Ages (although O'Malley does not mention Gibbons by name), and was later also referred to in the 2005 RTÉ biographical series Haughey.

A few weeks after this incident Gibbons suffered a heart attack and was unable to vote for Haughey later that year in a no-confidence motion at which point the government fell. He lost his seat at the November 1982 general election and effectively retired from politics.

Retirement
In retirement Gibbons suffered from ill health and suffered a number of heart attacks and strokes. He never fully recovered from the physical assault on him outside the Dáil in 1982.

In 1986, Gibbons offered his support to Desmond O'Malley and the new Progressive Democrats, as he believed that there was no longer a place for him within Haughey's Fianna Fáil party. His son Martin Gibbons was elected to the Dáil for the new party in the 1987 general election. In 1997 another son, Jim Gibbons Jnr, was nominated by the Taoiseach Bertie Ahern as a member of the 21st Seanad.

Death
Jim Gibbons died on 20 December 1997 aged 73. He had married Margaret (Peg) O'Neill in 1950, and they had five sons and six daughters.

See also
Families in the Oireachtas

References

 

 

  
 

 

1924 births
1997 deaths
Fianna Fáil TDs
Members of the 16th Dáil
Members of the 17th Dáil
Members of the 18th Dáil
Members of the 19th Dáil
Members of the 20th Dáil
Members of the 21st Dáil
Members of the 23rd Dáil
Local councillors in County Kilkenny
Fianna Fáil MEPs
MEPs for the Republic of Ireland 1973–1977
Ministers for Defence (Ireland)
Ministers for Agriculture (Ireland)
Parliamentary Secretaries of the 18th Dáil